R. Kent Greenawalt (born June 25, 1936) was a University Professor at Columbia Law School.  His primary interests involve constitutional law, especially First Amendment jurisprudence, and legal philosophy.

Born in Brooklyn, New York, he received a B.A. from Swarthmore College in 1958, a B.Phil. from Oxford University in 1960 and an LL.B. from Columbia Law School in 1963. After law school, he clerked for Supreme Court Justice John Harlan. He joined the Columbia faculty in 1965. Greenawalt married Elaine Pagels in June 1995.

Civil Rights
Like fellow Columbia Law graduates Constance Baker Motley and Jack Greenberg, Greenawalt was heavily involved in the civil rights movement of the 1960s.  He spent one summer working for the Lawyers Committee for Civil Rights in Jackson, Mississippi and from 1966-69 served on the Civil Rights Committee of the Association of the Bar of the City of New York.  He was also a member of the Due Process Committee of the American Civil Liberties Union from 1969 to 1971.  He then served as Deputy Solicitor General from 1971-72.

Academic career
Greenawalt has taught at Columbia since 1965 in both the law school and department of philosophy.  He has also taught at Princeton University. He was a visiting fellow at Clare Hall, Cambridge (1972–73) and visiting fellow at All Souls College, Oxford (1979). He is a Fellow of the American Academy of Arts and Sciences, a member of the American Philosophical Society, and was President of the American Society for Political and Legal Philosophy from 1991-93. He was also the Chief Reporter for revisions to the Model Penal Code in 1970s.

Personal life
Greenawalt has three sons ranging in age from twenty-four to seventeen in 1995. He was widowed in 1988 after the passing of his wife Sanja Milić Greenawalt. He married Elaine Pagels, a scholar in religion and a widow with two children, in June 1995.

Selected publications
Conflicts of Law and Morality (1987)
Religious Convictions and Political Choice (1988)
Speech, Crime, and the Uses of Language (1989)
Law and Objectivity (1992)
Fighting Words (1995)
Rationales for Freedom of Speech (1995)
Private Consciences and Public Reasons (1995)
Does God Belong in Public Schools? (2005)

See also
 Constitutional law
 List of law clerks of the Supreme Court of the United States (Seat 9)
 United States constitutional law
 United States Constitution

References

1936 births
Living people
Swarthmore College alumni
Alumni of the University of Oxford
Columbia Law School alumni
Law clerks of the Supreme Court of the United States
Fellows of All Souls College, Oxford
Columbia Law School faculty
Philosophers of law
Scholars of constitutional law
American civil rights lawyers
Fellows of Clare Hall, Cambridge
Princeton University faculty
Fellows of the American Academy of Arts and Sciences
Legal scholars of the University of Oxford
Members of the American Philosophical Society